Psychotria angustata is a species of plant in the family Rubiaceae. It is endemic to the Galápagos Islands.

References

Flora of the Galápagos Islands
angustata
Endangered plants
Taxonomy articles created by Polbot